Alfred "Fred" Zinnemann (April 29, 1907 – March 14, 1997) was an Austrian Empire-born American film director. He won four Academy Awards for directing and producing films in various genres, including thrillers, westerns, film noir and play adaptations. He made 25 feature films during his 50-year career.

He was among the first directors to insist on using authentic locations and for mixing stars with civilians to give his films more realism. Within the film industry, he was considered a maverick for taking risks and thereby creating unique films, with many of his stories being dramas about lone and principled individuals tested by tragic events. According to one historian, Zinnemann's style demonstrated his sense of "psychological realism and his apparent determination to make worthwhile pictures that are nevertheless highly entertaining."

Among his films were The Search (1948), The Men (1950), High Noon (1952), From Here to Eternity (1953), Oklahoma! (1955),  The Nun's Story (1959), A Man For All Seasons (1966), The Day of the Jackal (1973), and Julia (1977). His films have received 65 Oscar nominations, winning 24; Zinnemann himself was nominated for ten, and won Best Director for From Here to Eternity (1953), Best Picture and Best Director for A Man for All Seasons (1966), and Best Documentary, Short Subjects for Benjy (1951).

Zinnemann directed and introduced a number of stars in their U.S. film debuts, including Marlon Brando, Rod Steiger, Pier Angeli, Julie Harris, Brandon deWilde, Montgomery Clift, Shirley Jones and Meryl Streep. He directed 19 actors to Oscar nominations, including Frank Sinatra, Montgomery Clift, Audrey Hepburn, Glynis Johns, Paul Scofield, Robert Shaw, Wendy Hiller, Jason Robards, Vanessa Redgrave, Jane Fonda, Gary Cooper and Maximilian Schell.

Early life

Zinnemann was born in Rzeszów, the son of Anna (Feiwel) and Oskar Zinnemann, a doctor. His parents were Austrian Jews. He had one younger brother. 

Zinnemann grew up in Vienna during the First World War, during much of which his father was serving with the Austro-Hungarian Army on the Eastern Front. Zinnemann later recalled that his father was severely traumatized by his war experiences and often suffered from nightmares.

While growing up in Austria, which after 1918 had become, "a tiny, defeated, impoverished country", Zinnemann wanted to become a musician, but went on to graduate with a law degree from the University of Vienna in 1927.

While studying law, he became drawn to films and convinced his parents to let him study film production in the Third French Republic. After studying for a year at the Ecole Technique de Photographie et Cinématographie in Paris, Zinnemann became a cameraman and found work on a number of films being made at Babelsberg Studio in Berlin, during the Weimar Republic, before emigrating to the United States. Both of Zinnemann's parents were later murdered during the Holocaust in Austria.

Career as director

Early career
Zinnemann worked in Germany with several other beginners (Billy Wilder and Robert Siodmak also worked with him on the 1929 feature People on Sunday) after he studied filmmaking in France. His penchant for realism and authenticity is evident in his first feature The Wave (1936), shot on location in Mexico with mostly non-professional actors recruited among the locals, which is one of the earliest examples of social realism in narrative film. Earlier in the decade, in fact, Zinnemann had worked with documentarian Robert Flaherty, "probably the greatest single influence on my work as a filmmaker", he said.

Although he was fascinated by the artistic culture of Germany, with its theater, music and films, he was also aware that the country was in a deep economic crisis. He became disenchanted with Berlin after continually seeing decadent ostentation and luxury existing alongside desperate unemployment. The wealthy classes were moving more to the political right and the poor to the left. "Emotion had long since begun to displace reason," he said. As a result of the changing political climate, along with the fact that sound films had arrived in Europe, which was technically unprepared to produce their own, film production throughout Europe slowed dramatically. Zinnemann, then only 21, got his parents' permission to go to America where he hoped filmmaking opportunities would be greater.

He arrived in New York at the end of October 1929, at the time of the stock market crash. Despite the financial panic then beginning, he found New York to be a different cultural environment:

He took a Greyhound bus to Hollywood a few months later following the completion of his first directorial effort for the Mexican cultural protest film, The Wave, in Alvarado, Mexico. He established residence in North Hollywood with Henwar Rodakiewicz, Gunther von Fritsch and Ned Scott, all fellow contributors to the Mexican project. One of Zinnemann's first jobs in Hollywood was as an extra in All Quiet on the Western Front (1930). He said that many of the other extras were former Russian aristocrats and high-ranking officers who fled to America as refugees from the October Revolution in 1917 and the ensuing Red Terror.

He was twenty-two but he said he felt older than the forty-year-olds in Hollywood. But he was jubilant because he was then certain that "this was the place one could breathe free and belong." But after a few years he became disillusioned with the limited talents of Hollywood's elites.

1940s

After some directing success with short films, he graduated to features in 1942, turning out two B mysteries, Kid Glove Killer and Eyes in the Night before getting his big break with The Seventh Cross (1944), starring Spencer Tracy, which became his first hit. The film was based on Anna Seghers' novel and, while filmed entirely on the MGM backlot, made realistic use of refugee German actors in even the smallest roles. The central character—an escaped prisoner played by Tracy—is seen as comparatively passive and fatalistic. He is, however, the subject of heroic assistance from anti-Nazi Germans. In a sense, the most dynamic character of the film is not the Tracy character but a humble German worker played by Hume Cronyn, who changes from Nazi sympathizer to active opponent of the regime as he aids Tracy.

After World War II, Zinnemann learned that both of his parents had been murdered in the Holocaust. He was frustrated by his studio contract, which dictated that he did not have a choice in directing films like Little Mister Jim (1946) and My Brother Talks to Horses (1947) despite his lack of interest in their subject matter. However, his next film, The Search (1948), won an Oscar for screenwriting and secured his position in the Hollywood establishment. Shot in war-ravaged Germany, the film stars Montgomery Clift in his screen debut as a GI who cares for a lost Czech boy traumatized by the war. It was followed by Act of Violence (1948), a gritty film noir starring Van Heflin as a haunted POW, Robert Ryan as his hot-tempered former friend, Janet Leigh as Heflin's wife, and Mary Astor as a sympathetic prostitute. Zinnemann considered Act of Violence the first project in which he "felt comfortable knowing exactly what I wanted and exactly how to get it."

1950s
The Men (1950) stars Marlon Brando as a paraplegic war veteran. It was Brando's first film. Zinnemann filmed many scenes in a California hospital where real patients served as extras. It was followed by Teresa (1951), starring Pier Angeli.

Perhaps Zinnemann's best-known work is High Noon (1952), one of the first 25 American films chosen in 1989 for the National Film Registry. With its psychological and moral examinations of its lawman hero Marshall Will Kane, played by Gary Cooper and its innovative chronology whereby screen time approximated the 80-minute countdown to the confrontational hour, the film broke the mold of the formulaic western. Working closely with cinematographer and longtime friend Floyd Crosby, he shot without filters, giving the landscape a harsh "newsreel" quality that clashed with the more painterly cinematography of John Ford's westerns. During production he established a strong rapport with Gary Cooper, photographing the aging actor in many tight close-ups which showed him sweating, and at one point, even crying on screen.

Screenwriter Carl Foreman apparently intended High Noon to be an allegory of Senator Joseph McCarthy's vendetta against alleged Communists. However, Zinnemann disagreed, insisting, late in life, that the issues in the film, for him, were broader, and were more about conscience and independent, uncompromising fearlessness. He says, "High Noon is "not a Western, as far as I'm concerned; it just happens to be set in the Old West."

Film critic Stephen Prince suggests that the character of Kane actually represents Zinnemann, who tried to create an atmosphere of impending threat on the horizon, a fear of potential "fascism", represented by the gang of killers soon arriving. Zinnemann explained the general context for many of his films: "One of the crucial things today [is] trying to preserve our civilization."

Prince adds that Zinnemann, having learned that both his parents were murdered in the Holocaust, wanted Kane willing to "fight rather than run", unlike everyone else in town. As a result, "Zinnemann allies himself" with the film's hero. Zinnemann explains the theme of the film and its relevance to modern times:

For his screen adaptation of the play The Member of the Wedding (1952), Zinnemann chose Julie Harris as the film's 12-year-old protagonist, although she was by then 26 years old. Two years earlier Harris had created the role on Broadway just as the two other leading actors, Ethel Waters and Brandon deWilde, had.

Zinnemann's next film, From Here to Eternity (1953), based on the novel by James Jones, was nominated for 13 Academy Awards and would go on to win 8, including Best Picture and Best Director. Zinnemann fought hard with producer Harry Cohn to cast Montgomery Clift as the character of Prewitt, although Frank Sinatra, who was at the lowest point of his popularity, cast himself in the role of "Maggio" against Zinnemann's wishes. Sinatra would later win an Oscar for Best Supporting Actor. From Here to Eternity also featured Deborah Kerr, best known for prim and proper roles, as a philandering Army wife. Donna Reed played the role of Alma "Lorene" Burke, a prostitute and mistress of Montgomery Clift's character which earned her an Academy Award for Best Supporting Actress for 1953.

In Oklahoma! (1955), Zinnemann's version of the Rodgers and Hammerstein musical, the wide screen format Todd-AO made its debut, as did the film's young star, Shirley Jones. It was also an expression of Zinnemann's continued faith and optimism about America, with its energy and exuberance.

His next film was A Hatful of Rain (1957), starring Don Murray, Eva Marie Saint and Anthony Franciosa, and was based on the play by Michael V. Gazzo. It is a drama story about a young married man with a secret morphine addiction who tries to quit and suffers through painful withdrawal symptoms. The film was a risk for Zinnemann, since movie depictions of drug addiction and withdrawal were rare in the 1950s.

Zinnemann rounded out the 1950s with The Nun's Story (1959), casting Audrey Hepburn in the role of Sister Luke, a nun who eventually gives up the religious life to join the Belgian resistance in the Second World War. The film was based on the life of Marie Louise Habets. Hepburn, who gave up the chance to play Anne Frank in order to work on The Nun's Story, considered the film to be her best and most personal work. Zinnemann's style of cutting from close-up to close-up was heavily influenced by Carl Theodor Dreyer's The Passion of Joan of Arc (1928), his favorite film. He was grateful that Hepburn was easy to work with:

1960s
The Sundowners (1960), starring Robert Mitchum and Deborah Kerr as an Australian outback husband and wife, led to more Academy Award nominations, including Best Picture, Best Director, Best Screenplay, Best Actress (Kerr) and Best Supporting Actress (Glynis Johns), but won none. Behold A Pale Horse (1964) was a post-Spanish Civil War epic based on the book Killing a Mouse on Sunday by Emeric Pressburger and starred Gregory Peck, Anthony Quinn and Omar Sharif, but was both a critical and commercial flop; Zinnemann would later admit that the film "didn't really come together."

In 1965 he was a member of the jury at the 4th Moscow International Film Festival.

Zinnemann's fortunes changed once again with A Man for All Seasons (1966), scripted by Robert Bolt from his own play and starring Paul Scofield as Sir Thomas More, portraying him as a man driven by conscience to his ultimate fate. The film went on to win six Academy Awards, including Best Picture, Best Actor (Scofield) and Best Director, Zinnemann's second such Oscar to date. The film was also entered into the 5th Moscow International Film Festival.

After this, Zinnemann was all set to direct an adaptation of Man's Fate for MGM. However, the project was shut down in 1969, and the studio attempted to hold Zinnemann responsible for at least $1 million of the $3.5 million that had already been spent on pre-production. In protest, Zinnemann filed a lawsuit against the studio, and it would be four years before he would make his next film.

1970s
By the early 1970s, Zinnemann had been out of work since the cancellation of Man's Fate; he believed it had "marked the end of an era in picture making and the dawn of a new one, when lawyers and accountants began to replace showmen as head of the studios and when a handshake was a handshake no longer." However, Universal then offered him the chance to direct The Day of the Jackal (1973), based on the best-selling suspense novel by Frederick Forsyth. The film starred Edward Fox as an English assassin hired to kill French president Charles de Gaulle, and Michael Lonsdale as the French detective charged with stopping him. Zinnemann was intrigued by the opportunity to direct a film in which the audience would already be able to guess the ending (the Jackal failing his mission), and was pleased when it ultimately became a hit with the public.

The Day of the Jackal was followed four years later by Julia (1977), based on  a story in the book Pentimento by Lillian Hellman. The film starred Jane Fonda as Hellman and Vanessa Redgrave as her best friend Julia, a doomed American heiress who forsakes the safety and comfort of great wealth to devote her life to the anti-Nazi cause in Germany. The film was nominated for 11 Academy Awards and won three, for Best Screenplay (Alvin Sargent), Best Supporting Actor (Jason Robards), and Best Supporting Actress for Redgrave, who drew scattered boos on Oscar night for her "Zionist hoodlums" acceptance speech. Zinnemann thought that Fonda's acting was extraordinary and she also deserved an Oscar.

1980s
Zinnemann's final film was Five Days One Summer (1982), filmed in Switzerland and based on the short story Maiden, Maiden by Kay Boyle. It starred Sean Connery and Betsy Brantley as a "couple" vacationing in the Alps in the 1930s, and a young Lambert Wilson as a mountain-climbing guide who grows heavily suspicious of their relationship. The film was both a critical and commercial flop, although Zinnemann would be told by various critics in later years that they considered it an underrated achievement. Zinnemann blamed the film's critical and commercial failure for his retirement from filmmaking: "I'm not saying it was a good picture. But there was a degree of viciousness in the reviews. The pleasure some people took in tearing down the film really hurt."

Final years and death
Zinnemann is often regarded as striking a blow against ageism in Hollywood. The apocryphal story goes that in the 1980s, during a meeting with a young Hollywood executive, Zinnemann was surprised to find the executive didn't know who he was, despite having won four Academy Awards, and directing many of Hollywood's biggest films. When the young executive asked Zinnemann to list what he had done in his career, Zinnemann reportedly answered, "Sure. You first." In Hollywood, the story is known as "You First," and is often alluded to when veteran creators find that upstarts are unfamiliar with their work.

Zinnemann insisted, "I've been trying to disown that story for years. It seems to me Billy Wilder told it to me about himself."

Zinnemann died of a heart attack in London, England on March 14, 1997. He was 89 years old. Zinneman's remains were cremated at Kensal Green Cemetery and the cremated remains were collected from the cemetery. His wife died on December 18, 1997.

Directing style

Zinnemann's training in documentary filmmaking and his personal background contributed to his style as a "social realist." With his early films between 1937 and 1942 he began using that technique, and with High Noon in 1952, possibly his finest film, he created the tense atmosphere by coordinating screen time with real time.

Because he started his film career as a cameraman, his movies are strongly oriented toward the visual aspects. He also said that regardless of the size of an actor's part, he spends much time discussing the roles with each actor separately and in depth. "In this way we make sure long before the filming starts that we are on the same wavelength," he says.

Zinnemann's films are mostly dramas about lone and principled individuals tested by tragic events, including High Noon (1952), From Here to Eternity (1953); The Nun's Story (1959); A Man For All Seasons (1966); and Julia (1977). Regarded as a consummate craftsman, Zinnemann traditionally endowed his work with meticulous attention to detail to create realism, and had an intuitive gift for casting and a preoccupation with the moral dilemmas of his characters. His philosophy about directing influenced director Alan Parker:

In From Here to Eternity, for example, he effectively added actual newsreel footage of the Japanese attack on Pearl Harbor, which enhanced and dramatized the story. Similarly, in A Hatful of Rain, he used a documentary style to present real life drug addiction in New York. Zinnemann again incorporated newsreel footage in Behold a Pale Horse, about the Spanish Civil War. The Day of the Jackal, a political thriller about an attempt to assassinate Charles de Gaulle, was shot on location in newsreel style, while Julia placed the characters in authentic settings, as in a suspenseful train journey from Paris to Moscow during World War II. According to one historian, Zinnemann's style "demonstrates the director's sense of psychological realism and his apparent determination to make worthwhile pictures that are nevertheless highly entertaining."

Honours and awards
Academy Award for Best Short Subject, One-Reel: That Mothers Might Live (1938).
Golden Globe for Best Film Promoting International Understanding: "The Search" (1948).
Academy Award for Best Documentary Short Subject: Benjy (1951).
New York Film Critics Circle Award for Best Director: High Noon (1952).
Academy Award for Best Director, Directors Guild of America (DGA) Award for Outstanding Directorial Achievement in Motion Pictures: From Here to Eternity (1953).
New York Film Critics Circle Award for Best Director: The Nun's Story (1959).
Academy Award for Best Director, New York Film Critics Circle Award for Best Director, and Directors Guild of America (DGA) Award for Outstanding Directorial Achievement in Motion Pictures: A Man for All Seasons (1966).
D. W. Griffith Award, 1971.
Order of Arts and Letters, France, 1982.
U.S. Congressional Lifetime Achievement Award, 1987.
John Huston Award, Artists Right Foundation, 1994.

Filmography

Feature films

Short films

Unfinished films

References

External links

 
 Literature on Fred Zinnemann
 Fred Zinnemann papers, Margaret Herrick Library, Academy of Motion Picture Arts and Sciences
 Fred Zinnemann (in German) from the online-archive of the Österreichische Mediathek

1907 births
1997 deaths
20th-century American businesspeople
American film directors
American film producers
American people of Austrian-Jewish descent
Austrian Jews
Austrian emigrants to the United States
Austrian film directors
BAFTA fellows
Best Directing Academy Award winners
Best Director Golden Globe winners
Directors Guild of America Award winners
English-language film directors
Filmmakers who won the Best Film BAFTA Award
Golden Globe Award-winning producers
Mountaineering film directors
People from Landstraße
Producers who won the Best Picture Academy Award
Western (genre) film directors